Rowing New Zealand is the sports governing body for rowing in New Zealand. Its purpose is to provide leadership and support to enable an environment of success for the New Zealand rowing community. This includes secondary schools, clubs, masters, universities and high performance.

Rowing New Zealand was founded as the New Zealand Amateur Rowing Association on 16 March 1887. The New Zealand Amateur Rowing Association was formed by nine clubs in an effort to coordinate and regulate the sport of amateur rowing in New Zealand.

Since the turn of the 21st century, Rowing New Zealand has had moderate success on the water, which has resulted in increased media interest in the sport of rowing and record participation at secondary school level. The aim is eventually to replicate the success of Great Britain and Australia on the water by the 2020 Olympics. This increase in the number of active rowers has been attributed in particular to Rob Waddell's gold medal victory at the 2000 Summer Olympics in Sydney. There have also been increases, particularly in the number of women rowers, since Georgina Evers-Swindell and Caroline Evers-Swindell won gold at the 2004 Athens Olympic Games.

The 2008 Olympic trials gained intense public and media interest as previous Olympic champion Rob Waddell challenged current world champion Mahé Drysdale for the sole men’s single sculls spot. In the final race, Waddell suffered a repeat of his atrial fibrillation condition, resulting in Drysdale claiming the victory and the sole 2008 Olympic single sculls spot.

Waddell was then selected into the double sculls with the young Nathan Cohen, world champion at the 2006 World University Games in single sculls, in early 2008. At the 2008 Summer Olympics in Shunyi Olympic Rowing-Canoeing Park, Shunyi, Beijing in August 2008, the two finished fourth in the double sculls final.

Cohen won the gold medal in double sculls at the next Olympic Games in 2012, with rowing partner Joseph Sullivan.

Cohen and Sullivan also won the World Championship in both 2010 and 2011.

Membership 
Sixty-eight clubs are affiliated to Rowing New Zealand. Clubs within New Zealand are affiliated to their regional rowing associations, which include the Auckland, Bay of Plenty, Canterbury, East Coast, Marlborough, Otago, Southland, Waikato, Whanganui and Wellington Rowing Associations.

Other members affiliated with Rowing New Zealand include the New Zealand Secondary Schools Rowing Association (NZSSRA), the New Zealand Universities Rowing Council, the New Zealand Rowing Race Officials Association, Regional Performance Centres (RPCs), Karapiro Rowing and Ruataniwha Rowing. RPCs provide a pathway for rowers to compete for selection in national representative crews as well as providing a high performance training environment for rowers. Karapiro Rowing and Ruataniwha Rowing operate and maintain the country's two main rowing venues: Lake Karapiro near Cambridge in the North Island, and Lake Ruataniwha near Twizel in the South Island.

Events 
 National Club Championships – First held in 1888 and only fours and single sculls competed. Now it is held alternatively at Lake Karapiro, Cambridge, and Lake Ruataniwha, Twizel. The event is now held over 5 days and more than 60 events are raced.
 Masters Championships – These are held annually and a rower may compete as a masters rower from the beginning of the year during which he or she reaches the age of 27.
 New Zealand University Championships – Are held annually and the top prizes include The Ashes (Overall NZU Rowing Champs Winners), the Tamaki Cup (Championship Women's Eight), the Paul Griffiths Cup (Championship Women's Four), and the Hebberley Shield (Championship Men's Eight).
 New Zealand Secondary School Championships (Maadi Cup) – The regatta is the largest school sports event in New Zealand and is held alternatively at Lake Karapiro, Cambridge, and Lake Ruataniwha, Twizel. 'Maadi Cup' is the name given to the regatta and the cup for the New Zealand Secondary Schools Boys' Under 18 Rowing Eights which is raced at the regatta. The top prizes at the regatta are the Maadi Cup, Springbok Shield, Levin Jubilee Cup, Dawn Cup and Star Trophy.

National teams 
Rowing New Zealand selects Elite, Development, Under 23, Under 21, Junior and Under 18 National Teams through selection camps and trials process. The Elite National Team represents New Zealand at the highest level of competition, either at the Olympic Games, World Championships or the Rowing World Cup. While the Olympics are held once every four years, the World Championships are held every year. The Rowing World Cup comprises 3 regattas held each year and overall winners are determined by points that are awarded to the top finishing boats at each event.

The Under 23 National Team competes at the Under 23 World Championship regatta each year while the Under 21 National Team competes at the Youth Cup Regatta in Australia.
The Junior National Team competes at the Junior World Championships each year and the Under 18 crews from the North Island and the South Island are selected annually to compete against one another.

Results

2010 World Championship Regatta 
Rowing New Zealand hosted the 2010 World Championship Regatta at Lake Karapiro, 12–19 September. New Zealand secured the rights to hold the 39th World Rowing Championship in 2006 and, in doing so, became one of only a handful of world rowing nations that have held more than one championship. At the official Closing Ceremony, FISA President Denis Oswald said: "I praise the Organising Committee for having staged such an outstanding event and I include all members of the Organising Committee and volunteers who have been so helpful and friendly to us. It won't take 32 years until we come back. Karapiro 2010 brought the World Championships to new standards and set a new model."

The first time the event came to New Zealand was in 1978. The 2010 event joins the 1978 event as being considered by many of the rowing community worldwide as being amongst the greatest ever world championships.

2005 World Championship Regatta 
The 2005 World Championship Regatta was one of the most successful event for Rowing New Zealand and New Zealand sport when four gold medals were won within 45 minutes, making New Zealand the most successful country at the regatta.
The four victories were:
 Mahé Drysdale in the men's single sculls.
 Juliette Haigh and Nicky Coles in the women's coxless pair.
 George Bridgewater and Nathan Twaddle in the men's coxless pair.
 Caroline Evers-Swindell and Georgina Evers-Swindell in the women's double sculls.

Olympic medallists

World champions

References

External links 
 Rowing New Zealand
 Historical information on Rowing in New Zealand 1996 to 2005

New Zealand
Rowing in New Zealand
Sports governing bodies in New Zealand
1887 establishments in New Zealand
Sports organizations established in 1887